Svetilovka is a rural locality (a selo) in Svetilovsky Selsoviet of Belogorsky District, Amur Oblast, Russia. The population was 413 as of 2018. There are 5 streets.

Geography 
Svetilovka is located on the left bank of the Tom River, 41 km west of Belogorsk (the district's administrative centre) by road. Velikoknyazevka is the nearest rural locality.

References 

Rural localities in Belogorsky District